John 'Jack' Francis Talling  (23 March 1929 in Grangetown, North Yorkshire – 20 June 2017) was a limnologist who contributed to our understanding of the River Nile, the great lakes of the African Rift Valley and those of the English Lake District. He was also an authority on the ecophysiology of freshwater phytoplankton.

He was elected Fellow of the Royal Society in 1978.

References

1929 births
2017 deaths
Fellows of the Royal Society
British limnologists